Yardley may refer to:

People

Surname
Bruce Yardley (1947–2019), Australian cricketer
David Yardley (1929–2014), British legal scholar and public servant
Doyle Yardley (1913–1946), American military officer
Eric Yardley (born 1990), American professional baseball pitcher
George Yardley (1928–2004), American basketball player
George Yardley (footballer) (1942–2018), Scottish footballer
Herbert Yardley (1889–1958), American cryptologist
Jane Yardley, English 20th-century author
Jim Yardley (born 1964), American journalist working in Rome
Jim Yardley (cricketer) (1946–2010), English first-class cricketer
Jimmy Yardley (1903–1959), Scottish professional footballer
John F. Yardley (1925–2001), American engineer
John H. Yardley, M.D. (born 1926), American pathologist
Jonathan Yardley (born 1939), book critic (Washington Post and Washington Star)
Lucy Yardley CPsychol FBPsS (born 1961), British psychologist and professor of health psychology
Malcolm Yardley (1940–2020), British sprinter
Mark Yardley (born 1969), Scottish professional footballer
Norman Yardley (1915–1989), English cricketer
Ralph O. Yardley (1878–1961), American cartoonist
Richard Q. Yardley (1903–1979), American editorial cartoonist
Robert Blake Yardley (1858–1943), British Barrister and philatelist
Robert Morris Yardley (1850–1902), Republican politician from Pennsylvania
Stephen Yardley (born 1942), English actor
Tracy Yardley (born 1979), American comic book artist
William F. Yardley (1844–1924), American attorney, politician and civil rights advocate
William Yardley (1632–1693), early settler of Bucks County, Pennsylvania
William Yardley (cricketer) (1849–1900), English cricketer

Given name
Yardley Chittick (1900–2008), for several years the oldest living patent attorney in the US
Marissa Yardley Clifford, British-American visual artist and writer based in Los Angeles
Yardley Griffin (born 1979), American gospel musician, recording artist, worship leader
Dame Kathleen Yardley Lonsdale (1903–1971), Irish pacifist, prison reformer and crystallographer
Athol Yardley Meyer (1940–1998), Australian journalist and politician
Patrick Nicholas Yardley Monrad Sanders (born 1966), senior British Army officer
Yardley Taylor (1794–1868), Quaker living in Goose Creek, Loudoun County, Virginia
Charles Yardley Turner (1850–1919), American painter, illustrator, muralist and teacher
Charles Yardley Weaver (1884–1930), Canadian politician, barrister, justice of the peace and soldier

Places
Yardley, Pennsylvania, United States
Yardley, a province of the former West Indies Federation
Yardley, Birmingham, an area of Birmingham city, UK
Birmingham Yardley (UK Parliament constituency)
South Yardley, electoral ward in Birmingham, England
Yardley Chase, 357.6 hectare biological Site of Special Scientific Interest, mostly in Northamptonshire, England
Yardley Court, school in Tonbridge, Kent, England
Yardley Gobion, village in Northamptonshire, England
Yardley Hastings, village in Northamptonshire, England
Yardley station, SEPTA Regional Rail station in Yardley, Pennsylvania
Yardley Wood, area of Birmingham, United Kingdom
Yardley-Wilburtha Bridge across the Delaware River

Business
E.S. Yardley & Co., known as Smith and Yardley, a firm of railway signalling and signal box contractors in Manchester, England
Yardley of London, a British personal care company

See also
Ardley (disambiguation)
Yardy
Yarly
Yeardley

English toponymic surnames